72P/Denning–Fujikawa is a periodic comet discovered on 4 October 1881 by William Frederick Denning. The comet was not seen at another apparition until recovered by Shigehisa Fujikawa in 1978. From 29 December 1978 until 17 June 2014, the comet was lost. On 17 June 2014 the comet was recovered by Hidetaka Sato.

Repeated failures to recover the comet during perihelion even in cases where it is estimated that it should have been magnitude 8 or, as in 1987 and 1996, it was being actively looked for suggest it is only occasionally active. This has resulted in it being classified as a transitional comet.

References

External links 
 Orbital simulation from JPL (Java) / Horizons Ephemeris

Periodic comets
072P
0072
Comets in 2014
18811004